Sillerpeton is an extinct genus of aïstopod tetrapodomorphs within the family Phlegethontiidae. It contains a single species, Sillerpeton permianum, which is based on braincases and vertebrae from the Early Permian Richards Spur locality of Oklahoma.

References

See also
 List of prehistoric amphibian genera

Aistopods
Cisuralian amphibians of North America
Fossil taxa described in 1978